Pinkman is a painter from Tokyo, Japan. He paints on a variety of mediums for his engaging live painting performances.

He was featured at the 2007 Camera Japan festival in the Netherlands (both painting and DJing). In 2008, Pinkman's Miruko won the Shinjuku Art Infinity Prize.

Media
In 2009, Pinkman was featured in the spring issue of the international magazine Butt magazine.

References

External links
 Official website

Living people
Japanese painters
Japanese erotic artists
Japanese pop artists
Artists from Saitama Prefecture
Year of birth missing (living people)